Clear Air Turbulence is the second studio album by British jazz rock band Ian Gillan Band, released in 1977 with cover by Chris Foss. The album was initially worked on during the period July 1976 to September 1976. A UK tour was promoted, though all of the dates were postponed until April 1977 in order that the new album could be rerecorded and remixed at Kingsway Recorders, London.

The album was reissued in 1989 by Virgin Records on CD, and in 2010 by Edsel Records.

Track listing 
 All tracks written by Ray Fenwick, Ian Gillan, John Gustafson, Mark Nauseef, Colin Towns.
Side 1
 "Clear Air Turbulence" – 7:35
 "Five Moons" – 7:30
 "Money Lender" – 5:38

Side 2
 "Over the Hill" – 7:14
 "Goodhand Liza" – 5:24
 "Angel Manchenio" – 7:17

The Rockfield Mixes 
Ian Gillan became dissatisfied with the final mixes of the album and this delayed its eventual release. What eventually became the album Clear Air Turbulence was remixed at Kingsway before release, but the original mix had taken place at Rockfield Studios in Wales. In 1997 the original mix was released by Angel Air Records under the title The Rockfield Mixes and represents a "cleaner" (or at least earlier) version of the album. It also includes an extra track which didn't make it to the original release. The track list was altered as follows:

 "Over the Hill" – 7:20
 "Clear Air Turbulence" – 7:47
 "Five Moons" – 7:34
 "Money Lender" – 5:40
 "Angel Manchenio" – 7:21
 "This Is the Way" – 2:03
 "Goodhand Liza" – 5:20

The Rockfield Mixes Plus 
In 2004 a further variant of the album was released as The Rockfield Mixes Plus containing four previously unreleased tracks and an interview with Ray Fenwick. The extra tracks were:
 "Apathy" (backing track) – 4:14
 "Over the Hill" (live) – 9:50
 "Smoke on the Water" (live) – 7:38
 "Mercury High" (backing track) – 3:33

Personnel 
Ian Gillan Band
 Ian Gillan – vocals
 Colin Towns – keyboards and flutes
 Ray Fenwick – guitars and vocals
 John Gustafson – bass guitar and vocals
 Mark Nauseef – drums and percussion

Additional musicians
 Phil Kersie – tenor saxophone on "Five Moons"
 Martin Firth – baritone saxophone
 John Huckridge – trumpets
 Derek Healey – trumpets
 Malcolm Griffiths – trombone

Production notes 
 Produced by Ian Gillan Band
 Recorded and mixed at Kingsway Recorders, London
 Recording engineer – Brad Davis
 Remix engineer – Louis Austin
 Assistant engineers – Paul Watkins, Bob Broglia
 Brass arrangements – Cy Payne on "Clear Air Turbulence", "Money Lender" and "Goodhand Liza"

References

External links 
 Ian Gillan Band - Clear Air Turbulence (1977) album review by Alex Henderson, credits & releases at AllMusic
 Ian Gillan Band - Clear Air Turbulence (1977) album releases & credits at Discogs
 Ian Gillan Band - The Rockfield Mixes (rec. 1976, rel. 1997) album credits & releases at AllMusic
 Ian Gillan Band - The Rockfield Mixes (rec. 1976, rel. 1997) album releases & credits at Discogs
 Ian Gillan Band - The Rockfield Mixes Plus (rec. 1976, rel. 2004) album credits & releases at AllMusic
 Ian Gillan Band - The Rockfield Mixes Plus (rec. 1976, rel. 2004) album releases & credits at Discogs
 Ian Gillan Band - The Rockfield Mixes Plus (rec. 1976, rel. 2004) album to be listened as stream on Spotify

1977 albums
Jazz fusion albums by English artists
Island Records albums
Ian Gillan albums